The 42nd Guards "Evpatoriyskaya Red Banner" Motor Rifle Division (Military Unit Number 27777, until 1987 MUN 29410; until 2009 MUN 28320) is a Russian military unit.

The division was formed as the 111th Rifle Division in Vologda in 1940, and became the 24th Guards Rifle Division in March 1942. It was based in the North Caucasus following World War II; it became 42nd Guards MRD on 10 June 1957, while at Grozny. It became 42nd Guards Training Motor Rifle Division, part of the 12th Army Corps, on 18 October 1960.

Second World War 
The division was formed in July 1940 in Vologda as the 111th Rifle Division on the basis of the 29th Reserve Brigade of the Arkhangelsk Military District.

In the active army from June 22, 1941, to March 17, 1942. On July 16, 1940, the division was fully formed (which became the division's anniversary). Until March 1941, the 111th Rifle Division only held 3,000 personnel. According to the "Reference on the deployment of the Armed Forces of the USSR in the event of a war in the West", prepared by N.F. Vatutin on May 13, 1941, the 111th Rifle Division was supposed to join the 28th Army. From June 10 to June 20, 1941, the 111th Rifle Division was brought up to strength with 6,000 assigned personnel. The peacetime shtat No. 4/120 in the spring of 1941 was 5900 personnel. The division met at the beginning of the war in the Vinnitsa region. On June 22, 1941, the 111th Rifle Division was in field camps at the Kushchuba training center, 50 km from Vologda. From June 24 to June 30, 1941, the 111th Rifle Division was included in the 41st Rifle Corps of the Moscow Military District. The division was redeployed through Yaroslavl and Leningrad and then departed for the North-Western Front. On June 30, 1941, the corps arrived in the region of the city of Ostrov, Pskov Oblast, to engage in defense in the Ostrovsky and Pskov fortified areas. Under enemy fire, parts of the division unloaded at the stations of Pskov, Cherskaya, Ostrov and moved directly from the railway into battle. On July 10, the first commander of the division, Colonel I. M. Ivanov, died.

Training Centre 1987-1992 
 
On 14 September 1987 it became 173rd Guards District Training Centre. In 1991 it comprised the 70th, 71st and 72nd Motor Rifle Regiments; the 392nd Tank Regiment at Shali; the 50th Guards Training Artillery Regiment; and the 1203rd Anti-aircraft Rocket Regiment. In November 1990 it had a total of 219 tanks, 187 being T-55s.

From September to December 1991, part of the Training Centre's equipment and weapons were withdrawn from Chechnya by rail. In 1992, the Training Centre was disbanded. By Directive of the General Staff of the Armed Forces No. 314/3/0159 dated January 4, 1992, the 173rd Guards District Training Centre was to be disbanded, and weapons and military equipment were to be removed. In accordance with a cipher telegram from the Minister of Defense of Russia, General of the Army P. S. Grachev, dated May 20, 1992, the commander of the North Caucasus Military District was allowed to transfer to the Chechen Republic of Ichkeria 50 percent of military equipment and weapons from the Training Centre.

In early January Major General P. Sokolov, the commander of the Training Centre, issued an order to issue personal weapons to officers and ensigns, in order to protect them and other Soviet personnel from Chechen attacks.

Much of the Training Centre's armament and military equipment, and other military units, through robbery and extortion, passed into the hands of Chechen separatists. Only 400 thousand small arms fell into the hands of Dzhokhar Dudayev, which was in warehouses and bases. In the village of Shali, where the tank regiment was stationed, all armored vehicles remained completely. The separatists also received 42 tanks, 34 infantry fighting vehicles, 14 armored personnel carriers, 139 artillery systems, 101 anti-tank weapons, 27 anti-aircraft guns and installations, two helicopters, 27 wagons of ammunition, 3,050 tons of fuel and lubricants, 38 tons of clothing, 254 tons of food.

In 1992, when the division was disbanded, the following were transferred to the Chechen Republic: 44 MT-LBs, 57,000 small arms, and 27 wagons of ammunition.

Reformed 
Following the beginning of the Second Chechen War the division was designated in December 1999 as the permanent garrison force for Chechnya and various military districts started raising its regiments separately in 2000. The division was intended to have a strength of 15,500 men. Its headquarters was established at Khankala outside Groznyy, with the 71st Motor Rifle Regiment also at the same base; the 71st MRR was raised in the Volga Military District. 70th Motor Rifle Regiment was formed in the Urals MD and located at Shali. 72nd MRR, raised from the 2nd Guards Tamanskaya Motor Rifle Division in the Moscow Military District was established at Kalinovskaya, and 291st Motor Rifle Regiment, originating in the Leningrad Military District, was set up at Borzoy.

On 1 July 2000, the Russian military leadership announced that a different place had been selected for stationing one of the regiments of the 42nd Division. Deputy Defence Minister for the construction and quartering of troops, Colonel-General Aleksandr Kosovan (:ru:Косован, Александр Давыдович) said that the MOD had decided on the area of the Borzoy settlement instead of the planned Itum-Kale for its motor rifle regiment. He also said that three of the regiments of the 42nd Division were going to be equipped "to the maximum" by the end of the year. The writer Michael Orr, noted that the 291st Motor Rifle Regiment had been relocated 'when the tactical vulnerability of the position [originally Itum-Kale] was appreciated.' The division was equipped with T-62 tanks, with at least one regiment having BMP-1 IFVs (infantry fighting vehicles).

The 42nd Division included two Chechen battalions, the Vostok and Zapad units. The two battalions were apparently GRU Spetsnaz units but under the operational command of the 42nd Division. Units of the division fought in the Russo-Georgian War 2008. Following the 2008 Russian military reform, the division was downsized into the 18th Guards Motor Rifle Brigade.

The division was reestablished in 2016, based on the 18th Guards Motor Rifle Brigade as well as additional units. In November 2021 units of the division were deployed to Crimea. The division took part in the 2022 Russian invasion of Ukraine with three of its Motor Rifle Regiments (70th, 71st, and 291st). The 70th Motorized Rifle Regiment suffered substantial losses in southeastern Ukraine.

Notes

References 
 
 

042
042
Military units and formations established in 1957
Military units and formations disestablished in 2009
Military units and formations established in 2016